Niphona pannosa is a species of beetle in the family Cerambycidae. It was described by Francis Polkinghorne Pascoe in 1862. It is known from Thailand and Cambodia.

References

pannosa
Beetles described in 1862